The UK Singles Chart is one of many music charts compiled by the Official Charts Company that calculates the best-selling singles of the week in the United Kingdom. Before 2004, the chart was only based on the sales of physical singles. This list shows singles that peaked in the Top 10 of the UK Singles Chart during 1958, as well as singles which peaked in 1957 and 1959 but were in the top 10 in 1958. The entry date is when the single appeared in the top 10 for the first time (week ending, as published by the Official Charts Company, which is six days after the chart is announced).

Eighty-four singles were in the top ten in 1958. Ten singles from 1957 remained in the top 10 for several weeks at the beginning of the year, while "Love Makes the World Go 'Round" by Perry Como, "Tea for Two Cha Cha" by The Tommy Dorsey Orchestra starring Warren Covington and "Tom Dooley" by The Kingston Trio were all released in 1958 but did not reach their peak until 1959. "All the Way"/"Chicago" by Frank Sinatra, "Let's Have a Ball" by Winifred Atwell, "My Special Angel" by Malcolm Vaughan and "Reet Petite (The Sweetest Girl in Town)" by Jackie Wilson were the singles from 1957 to reach their peak in 1958. Twenty artists scored multiple entries in the top 10 in 1958. Cliff Richard, Connie Francis, Marty Wilde, Michael Holliday and Ricky Nelson were among the many artists who achieved their first UK charting top 10 single in 1958.

The 1957 Christmas number-one, "Mary's Boy Child" by Harry Belafonte, remained at number-one for the first two weeks of 1958. The first new number-one single of the year was "Great Balls of Fire" by Jerry Lee Lewis. Overall, thirteen different singles peaked at number-one in 1958, with Connie Francis (2) having the most singles hit that position.

Background

Multiple entries
Eighty-four singles charted in the top 10 in 1958, with seventy-five singles reaching their peak this year. Six songs were recorded by several artists with each version reaching the top 10:

"Come prima" - Marino Marini & His Quartet, Malcolm Vaughan (version known as "More Than Ever")
"Kewpie Doll" - Frankie Vaughan, Perry Como
"Kisses Sweeter Than Wine" - Frankie Vaughan, Jimmie Rodgers
"Lollipop" - The Chordettes, The Mudlarks
"Tom Dooley" - The Kingston Trio, Lonnie Donegan
"Volare" - Dean Martin, Domenico Modugno

Twenty artists scored multiple entries in the top 10 in 1958. Elvis Presley secured the record for most top 10 hits in 1958 with five hit singles.

Michael Holliday was one of a number of artists with two top-ten entries, including the number-one single "The Story of My Life". Frankie Vaughan, Jerry Lee Lewis, Lonnie Donegan and Ricky Nelson were among the other artists who had multiple top 10 entries in 1958.

Chart debuts
Thirty-three artists achieved their first top 10 single in 1958, either as a lead or featured artist. Bernard Bresslaw, Connie Francis, Jimmie Rodgers, Michael Holliday, The Mudlarks, Ricky Nelson, Cliff Richard and The Shadows all had one other entry in their breakthrough year.

The following table (collapsed on desktop site) does not include acts who had previously charted as part of a group and secured their first top 10 solo single.

Notes
Buddy Holly was the lead singer with The Crickets, appearing on their 1957 number-one hit "That'll Be the Day". As well as scoring two top 10 hits with the group this year ("Oh, Boy!" and "Maybe Baby"), Holly also achieved two solo entries during the year with "Peggy Sue" and "Rave On".

Songs from films
Original songs from various films entered the top 10 throughout the year. These included "Great Balls of Fire" (from Jamboree), "Jailhouse Rock" (Jailhouse Rock), "April Love" (April Love), "On the Street Where You Live" (My Fair Lady), "Hard Headed Woman" & "King Creole" (King Creole) and "A Certain Smile" (A Certain Smile).

Best-selling singles
Until 1970 there was no universally recognised year-end best-sellers list. However, in 2011 the Official Charts Company released a list of the best-selling single of each year in chart history from 1952 to date. According to the list, "Jailhouse Rock" by Elvis Presley is officially recorded as the biggest-selling single of 1958. "Jailhouse Rock" (5) was ranked in the top 10  best-selling singles of the decade.

Top-ten singles
Key

Entries by artist

The following table shows artists who achieved two or more top 10 entries in 1958, including singles that reached their peak in 1957 or 1959. The figures include both main artists and featured artists. The total number of weeks an artist spent in the top ten in 1958 is also shown.

Notes

 The Drifters changed their name to The Shadows in 1959, to avoid confusion with the American group of the same name, who also threatened legal action over the band's name after "Feelin' Fine" was released in the United States.
 "Tea for Two Cha Cha" reached its peak of number three on 8 January 1959 (week ending).
 "Tom Dooley" (The Kingston Trio version) reached its peak of number five on 8 January 1959 (week ending).
 "Diana" re-entered the top 10 at number 10 on 9 January 1958 (week ending).
 "Mary's Boy Child" re-entered the top 10 at number 10 on 25 December 1958 (week ending).
 "All I Have to Do Is Dream"/"Claudette" is recorded as the best-selling single of the year by some sources but the Official Charts Company lists "Jailhouse Rock" as its best-seller. According to one list, "Jailhouse Rock" does not even make the top ten best-sellers.
 "Magic Moments"/"Catch a Falling Star" are credited as separate songs on some best-selling singles chart.
 "Don't" re-entered the top 10 at number 9 on 8 May 1958 (week ending).
 "It's Too Soon to Know" re-entered the top 10 at number 10 on 22 May 1958 (week ending).
 "Stairway of Love" re-entered the top 10 at number 9 on 17 July 1958 (week ending).
 "Witch Doctor" re-entered the top 10 at number 10 on 24 July 1958 (week ending).
 "Sugar Moon" re-entered the top 10 at number 10 on 14 August 1958 (week ending).
 "Patricia" re-entered the top 10 at number 10 on 25 September 1958 (week ending).
 "Splish Splash" re-entered the top 10 at number 10 on 11 September 1958 (week ending) for 5 weeks.
 "More Than Ever" re-entered the top 10 at number 8 on 13 November 1958 (week ending) for 7 weeks.
 "Tea for Two Cha Cha" re-entered the top 10 at number 6 on 11 December 1958 (week ending) for 8 weeks.
 "Tom Dooley" (Lonnie Donegan version) re-entered the top 10 at number 10 on 5 February 1959 (week ending).
 "Tom Dooley" (The Kingston Trio version) re-entered the top 10 at number 10 on 29 January 1959 (week ending).
 Figure includes two top 10 hits with the group The Crickets.
 Figure includes single that peaked in 1957.
 Figure includes single that first charted in 1957 but peaked in 1958.
 Figure includes single that peaked in 1959.

See also
1958 in British music
List of number-one singles from the 1950s (UK)

References
General

Specific

External links
1958 singles chart archive at the Official Charts Company (click on relevant week)

1958 record charts
1958
1958 in British music